Artūrs Lazdiņš (born 9 April 1997) is a Latvian tennis player.

Lazdiņš has a career high ATP singles ranking of 1234 achieved on 16 July 2019. He also has a career high ATP doubles ranking of 923 achieved on 5 August 2019.

Lazdiņš represents Latvia at the Davis Cup where he has a W/L record of 3–2.

Future and Challenger finals

Doubles 1 (1–0)

Davis Cup

Participations: (3–2)

   indicates the outcome of the Davis Cup match followed by the score, date, place of event, the zonal classification and its phase, and the court surface.

* Walkover doesn't count in his overall record.

External links

1997 births
Living people
Latvian male tennis players
People from Dobele